Keshit (also Romanized as Keshīt and Kashit) is a village in Keshit Rural District, Golbaf District, Kerman County, Kerman Province, Iran. At the 2006 census, its population was 1,035, in 230 families.

References 

Populated places in Kerman County